Bernard Tsumega Bulbwa (born 11 October 1996) is a Nigerian professional footballer who plays as a striker.

Early and personal life
Bulbwa is the youngest of seven children.

Club career
After playing youth football for Mkar Rocks and Shuttle Sports Academy, Bulbwa signed a five-year contract with Tunisian club Espérance in April 2015. Earlier that month he had been linked with possible transfers to English clubs Stoke City and Manchester City, as well as clubs in Nigeria and Europe.

International career
Bulbwa has played for the Nigeria under-20 team, and scored the winner in the final of the 2015 African U-20 Championship. He was described as a "hero" due to his performance, and his goal was awarded "Best of the Tournament" by CAF. He was selected to the 2015 FIFA U-20 World Cup in May 2015.

References

External links

1996 births
Living people
Nigerian footballers
Nigeria under-20 international footballers
Association football forwards
Espérance Sportive de Tunis players
MC Oujda players
NK Dugopolje players
Ankaraspor footballers
Al-Nahda Club (Oman) players
Tunisian Ligue Professionnelle 1 players
Botola players
First Football League (Croatia) players
TFF First League players
Nigerian expatriate footballers
Nigerian expatriate sportspeople in Tunisia
Expatriate footballers in Tunisia
Nigerian expatriate sportspeople in Morocco
Expatriate footballers in Morocco
Nigerian expatriate sportspeople in Croatia
Expatriate footballers in Croatia
Nigerian expatriate sportspeople in Turkey
Expatriate footballers in Turkey
Nigerian expatriate sportspeople in Oman
Expatriate footballers in Oman